Der Gang nach dem Eisenhammer is a ballad written by Friedrich Schiller, as part of his 1797 ballad competition with Goethe.

Sources
 Moritz Retzsch: Acht Umrisse zu Schiller's Fridolin: oder der Gang nach dem Eisenhammer. Mit einigen Andeutungen von Carl August Böttiger. Cotta, Stuttgart 1837. 
 Ulrike Völz: Funktion des Mittelalters in Schillers klassischen Balladen „Ritter Toggenburg“ und „Der Gang nach dem Eisenhammer“. Hausarbeit, Universität Greifswald 1990.

External links

Poetry by Friedrich Schiller
Ballads
1797 poems